The General Court of New Hampshire is the bicameral state legislature of the U.S. state of New Hampshire. The lower house is the New Hampshire House of Representatives with 400 members. The upper house is the New Hampshire Senate with 24 members. This ratio of 1 Senate seat for every 16.67 House seats makes New Hampshire's ratio of upper house to lower house seats the largest in the country.

During the 2018–2020 session, the New Hampshire General Court was controlled by Democrats, with a 14–10 majority in the Senate and a 230–156–1 majority in the House, with 13 vacant seats at the end of the session. On November 3, 2020, Republicans won control of the New Hampshire General Court by winning a 14–10 majority in the Senate and a 213–187 majority in the House.

The General Court convenes in the New Hampshire State House in downtown Concord. The State House opened in 1819. The House of Representatives continues to meet in its original chambers, making Representatives Hall the oldest chamber in the United States still in continuous legislative use. When numbered seats were installed in Representatives Hall, the number thirteen was purposely omitted in deference to triskaidekaphobia.

The annual pay for legislators is set by law at $100.00.

House of Representatives

The House of Representatives consists of 400 members coming from 204 districts across the state created from divisions of the state's counties, each making up about 3,000 residents for every one legislator.

Unlike many legislative chambers, there is no central "aisle" to cross. Instead, there are five sections with aisles between them. Party seating location is not enforced, as seating is often decided on the personal preference of the legislator, except in the case of the sixth section, which is the speaker's seat at the head of the hall.

Composition of the House of Representatives 

As of February 2023, the composition of the House of Representatives is:

New Hampshire Senate

The New Hampshire Senate has been meeting since 1784.  It consists of 24 members representing Senate districts based on population. As of the 2021-22 legislative session, there will be 14 Republicans and 10 Democrats in the Senate.

Composition of the Senate

Media coverage

The New Hampshire State House press covers the New Hampshire State House for newspapers, news services and other news-gathering operations. The New Hampshire General Court website has calendars and journals for both the House and the Senate.

Pew Research Center in 2014 reported New Hampshire had one of the nation's smallest statehouse press corps, with five full-time reporters and an additional nine part-time reporters.

References

External links

 
General Court
Bicameral legislatures